Nemapogon somchetiella is a moth of the family Tineidae. It is found in Italy and Russia (the Caucasus region).

References

Moths described in 1961
Nemapogoninae